Đuro Radović (born 20 February 1999) is a water polo player for Montenegro. Đuro started playing water polo at PVK Jadran, and he is a member of a first squad since 2014.Considered one of the top left-handed players in the world and is the best young player in the world.

Đuro also plays for a senior Montenegro men's national water polo team. He played at 2017 World Aquatics Championships in Budapest and won 5-th place.

Honours

Club
PVK Jardan
LEN Euro Cup runners-up : 2018–19
Montenegrin Championship: 2014–15, 2015–16, 2016–17, 2017–18, 2018–19, 2020–21
Montenegrin Cup: 2014–15, 2015–16, 2016–17, 2017–18, 2018–19, 2019–20, 2020–21

Awards
Best Young player in Montenegro 2017
Best Young player in the Adriatic League 2019

References

Living people
1999 births
Montenegrin male water polo players
Olympiacos Water Polo Club players
Competitors at the 2018 Mediterranean Games
Mediterranean Games bronze medalists for Montenegro
Mediterranean Games medalists in water polo